Henry Herbert, 1st Earl of Carnarvon PC (20 August 1741 – 3 June 1811), known as The Lord Porchester from 1780 to 1793, was a British Whig politician who sat in the House of Commons from 1768 to 1780 when he was raised to the peerage as Baron Porchester. He served as Master of the Horse from 1806 to 1807 in the Ministry of All the Talents headed by Lord Grenville.

Background and education
Herbert was the son of Major-General the Honourable William Herbert (c. 1696 – 31 March 1757), fifth son of Thomas Herbert, 8th Earl of Pembroke. His mother was Catherine Elizabeth Tewes (d. 28 August 1770). Educated at Eton and Magdalene College, Cambridge, he inherited Highclere Castle from his uncle the Honourable Robert Sawyer Herbert in 1769.

Political career
Herbert sat in the House of Commons as one of two representatives for Wilton from 1768 to 1780. The latter year he was raised to the peerage as Baron Porchester, of Highclere in the County of Southampton. In 1793 he was further honoured when he was made Earl of the Town and County of Carnarvon, in the Principality of Wales. He later served as Master of the Horse from 1806 to 1807 in the Ministry of All the Talents headed by Lord Grenville and was admitted to the Privy Council in 1806.

Marriage and progeny

On 15 July 1771 Lord Carnarvon married Lady Elizabeth Alicia Maria Wyndham (d. 1826) a daughter of Charles Wyndham, 2nd Earl of Egremont, by whom he had five sons and one daughter:
 Henry George Herbert, 2nd Earl of Carnarvon (1772–1833), eldest son and heir.
 Capt. Hon. Charles Herbert (1774–1808).
 Very Rev. Hon. William Herbert (1778–1847).
Lady Frances Herbert (c. 1782–1830), who married Thomas Moreton, 1st Earl of Ducie and had issue.
Rev. Hon. George Herbert (1789–1825), vicar of Tibenham, Norfolk.
 Hon. Algernon Herbert (1792–1855), antiquary.

Death and burial
Carnarvon died in June 1811, aged 69.

References

External links

1741 births
1811 deaths
People educated at Eton College
Alumni of Magdalene College, Cambridge
British MPs 1768–1774
British MPs 1774–1780
1
Henry Herbert, 01st Earl of Carnarvon
Members of the Parliament of Great Britain for English constituencies
Members of the Privy Council of the United Kingdom